The Catalina 320 is an American sailboat, that was designed by Gerry Douglas and first built in 1993.

Production
The boat was built by Catalina Yachts in the United States starting in 1993. The design is now out of production.

Design

The Catalina 320 is a small recreational keelboat, built predominantly of fiberglass. It has a masthead sloop rig, an internally-mounted spade-type rudder and a fixed fin bulb keel. It displaces  and carries  of ballast.

Variants
Catalina 320
Original model introduced in 1993. The fin keel model has a PHRF racing average handicap of 159 with a high of 170 and low of 147. The wing keel model has a PHRF racing average handicap of 153 with a high of 165 and low of 141.
Catalina 320 Mark II
Improved model introduced in 2006.

See also
List of sailing boat types

Similar sailboats
Bayfield 30/32
B Boats B-32
Beneteau Oceanis 321
C&C 32
C&C 99
Douglas 32
Hunter 32 Vision
Hunter 326
J/32
Mirage 32
Nonsuch 324
Ontario 32
Ranger 32

References

External links

Keelboats
1990s sailboat type designs
Sailing yachts
Sailboat types built by Catalina Yachts
Sailboat type designs by Gerry Douglas